Jonathan Pool, born 1942 in Chicago, is a political scientist from the United States. He works on the political and economic consequences of linguistic circumstances and language policy.

Pool studied political science in Harvard between 1960 and 1964. He then joined the Peace Corps and went to Turkey, where he taught English. After his return he studied in Chicago, where he graduated in 1968 and earned his PhD in 1971.

Pool worked at the universities of Chicago, New York (Stony Brook), Washington (Seattle), Stanford as well as in Mannheim, Paderborn, and Bielefeld in Germany. After 1996 he worked as a chief strategist for Centerplex, an enterprise in Tukwila, Washington, near Seattle. He now is president of Utilika Foundation.

Pool has always been impressed by the degree to which peoples' first language and linguistic knowledge influence their lives. When, as a nine-year-old, he had a friend whose parents had immigrated from Brazil, he decided to learn Portuguese while his friend learned English, for reasons of fairness. While teaching English in Turkey he was surprised to find how many people got their jobs on the basis of their knowledge of languages rather than of their professional skills. This influenced the choice of his research field; in 1981 he published a paper on the measurement of the consequences of linguistic discrimination. At that time he met Reinhard Selten, with whom he worked on the application of game theory on problems of linguistic diversity. In 1991 he published a research paper proposing an economic compensation for the need to learn languages. This was an early form of the concept of a language tax.

Some publications 
Pool, Jonathan 1977 : De LMLP al LPLP. Nova vesto por la faka revuo, Esperanto, 853 (1), p. 3-4
Reinhard Selten; Jonathan Pool 1995 : Enkonduko en la teorion de lingvaj ludoj : ĉu mi lernu esperanton? Berlin : Akademia Libroservo, 1995

Further reading
PanLex: Jonathan Pool Short biography and list of Research and other writing

References

1942 births
Living people
American Esperantists
Harvard University alumni
University of Chicago faculty
University of Washington faculty
Stony Brook University faculty
Stanford University faculty
Academic staff of the University of Mannheim
Academic staff of Paderborn University
American political scientists
American political philosophers
Academic staff of Bielefeld University